Amal Al Qubaisi (born 18 October 1969) was the speaker of the United Arab Emirates Federal National Council (FNC) from 2015 to 2019. She was first female leader of a national assembly in the United Arab Emirates and the Arab world. Before holding the position she was the chairwomen of the Abu Dhabi Education Council.

Career and education 
In 2000, Al Qubaisi earned her Ph.D. in Architectural Engineering from the University of Sheffield in the United Kingdom and holds the world’s only doctoral degree on the conservation of the UAE’s architectural heritage. She became an assistant professor of architecture at UAE University in 2000 which she held until 2006. As an architect, she has worked with UNESCO to document and preserve more than 350 historical sites in the UAE including Al Jahili and Al Hosn Forts.

In 2001, she was appointed President of the cultural heritage unit of Al Ain's Tourism and Economic Development Authority. She served as president until 2003.

In 2007, she was elected to be a member of FNC for Abu Dhabi, making her the first woman elected. President of the education, youth, media and culture committee. Member of health, labour and social affairs committee.

In 2011, Al Quabaisi was chosen as first deputy speaker of the FNC and became the first woman to chair a council session in 2013. In 2014, she was appointed as chairwomen of the Abu Dhabi Education Council.

On November 18, 2015, Al Qubaisi was appointed President of the FNC, making her the region’s first female leader of a national assembly.

She was a member of the Cosmos Club in Washington DC.

Awards 
 2008, Abu Dhabi Award
 2008, Middle East Excellence Award of Women Leadership, for being the most prominent female for her outstanding political achievement in 2007
 2009, Abu Dhabi Medal of Honor
 2014, Emirati Pioneers Award, for being the first Emirati woman elected to join the Federal National Council.
 2016, Honorary Doctorate from the University of Sheffield

References

1969 births
Living people
People from Abu Dhabi
Alumni of the University of Sheffield
Emirati women in politics
Academic staff of United Arab Emirates University
Speakers of the Federal National Council
Emirati architects